Legally Blonde is a 2007 musical with music and lyrics by Laurence O'Keefe and Nell Benjamin and a book by Heather Hach. It is based on the novel Legally Blonde by Amanda Brown and the 2001 film of the same name. 

The show tells the story of Elle Woods, a sorority girl who enrolls at Harvard Law School to win back her ex-boyfriend Warner. She discovers how her knowledge of the law can help others, and she successfully defends exercise queen Brooke Wyndham in a murder trial. Throughout the show, very few characters have faith in Elle, but she manages to surprise them when she defies expectations while staying true to herself.

Legally Blonde premiered in pre-Broadway tryouts in San Francisco, California. In April 2007 the show moved to Broadway, opening to mixed reviews and disappointing sales. Jerry Mitchell directed and choreographed. The original cast starred Laura Bell Bundy as Elle, Christian Borle as Emmett, and Richard H. Blake as Warner. It received seven Tony nominations and ten Drama Desk nominations but did not win any. The West End production opened in January 2010 at the Savoy Theatre. The West End production was nominated for five Laurence Olivier Awards and won three, including the Best New Musical award.

The musical was recorded in September 2007 and aired on MTV in October 2007. Following this, a reality television program aired showing the audition process for the next person to play Elle Woods on Broadway. The winner was Bailey Hanks, who played the role from July 23, 2008, until the production closed on October 19, 2008. The runner-up, Autumn Hurlbert, was Hanks's understudy.

Plot

Act one
The girls of UCLA's sorority Delta Nu celebrate the expected engagement of their sorority president, Elle Woods, to her boyfriend Warner Huntington III, who is expected to propose that night. Led by Margot, Serena and Pilar, the girls help Elle find the perfect dress for the occasion ("Omigod You Guys"). However, when Elle goes on her dinner date with Warner, he tells her that he needs someone more serious to achieve his dream of getting a seat in the Senate, and breaks up with her ("Serious").

Elle is devastated and stays in her room for twelve days ("Daughter Of Delta Nu"), but decides to chase Warner to Harvard Law School to prove that she can be serious. With help from Delta Nu sister Kate, Elle studies for the LSATS. Instead of writing a personal essay, Elle bursts into the Harvard admission offices backed by a squad of cheerleaders. She is accepted after revealing she is motivated by love ("What You Want").

Having been granted acceptance to Harvard, Elle's highly-achieved classmates disapprove of her attire and personality, and the only person who is willing to help her is law-teaching assistant Emmett Forrest ("The Harvard Variations"). However, he cannot protect her in class from the bloodthirsty Professor Callahan ("Blood In The Water"). Callahan kicks the under-prepared Elle out of class at the suggestion of her classmate Vivienne Kensington, who happens to be Warner's new girlfriend. This "tragedy" summons the apparitions of the sisters of Delta Nu, who, acting as a Greek chorus visible and audible only to Elle, encourage her to stay positive ("Positive").

Elle, believing that being blonde is the problem, decides to become a brunette. She heads to the Hair Affair salon where she meets beautician Paulette, who, after counselling Elle that all bad hair decisions are motivated by love, talks to Elle of her dreams of meeting a handsome Irishman ("Ireland"), and encourages her not to give up or downplay her personal qualities. At the salon, Vivienne, who is discussing a party planned for next Friday, unexpectedly gives Elle an invitation, telling her it is a costume party. Paulette sends Elle off with a costume for the party with lyrics of encouragement ("Ireland (Reprise)").

Walking into the party as a Playboy Bunny, Elle soon realizes that she was tricked by Vivienne, as no one else is wearing a costume. Despite this, she still seeks out Warner in an effort to win him back, but he remains unimpressed ("Serious (Reprise)"). Elle runs from the party, only to meet Emmett, who struggles to understand Elle's love problems. He has Elle assess her priorities until she realizes it is her obsession with Warner that keeps her from earning his respect ("Chip On My Shoulder"). Freed from her need to please Warner, she defeats him in a classroom debate. Elle then helps Paulette get her dog back from her ex-boyfriend, using legal jargon and demonstrating that she is beginning to understand law.

Along with Enid Hoopes, Warner and Vivienne win two of Callahan's coveted internship positions, and Warner proposes to Vivienne on the spot right in front of Elle. Vivienne accepts with a kiss. Elle is devastated, but Emmett shows her the internship list, revealing Elle got an internship position as well. Elle realizes that she does not need a man to feel accepted in the world, and that all she needs is to believe in herself. Overjoyed, she celebrates, disses Warner, calls her mother to tell her the news and eagerly anticipates the trial ("So Much Better").

Act two
Act two begins with fitness queen Brooke Wyndham and her fitness team's workout video, which is being viewed by Elle, Callahan, Emmett, Vivienne, Warner, and Enid ("Whipped Into Shape"). Callahan tells the legal team that Brooke is accused of murdering her billionaire husband. At the jail, the legal team is unable to get Brooke to tell them her alibi and she refuses to plead guilty. Upon learning that they were both Delta Nu sisters, Brooke then privately tells Elle her alibi: Brooke was getting liposuction, which, if the public discovered, could destroy her fitness empire. She makes Elle promise not to tell anyone ("Delta Nu Nu Nu"). Because of Elle's loyalty to her client and refusal to state the alibi, Elle, and consequently Emmett, are shunned by the group. To cheer Emmett up and to increase his chances of impressing Callahan, Elle gives him a makeover ("Take It Like A Man").

Back at the salon, Elle is getting a manicure when Kyle, a sexy UPS courier, walks into the salon to deliver a package to Paulette. Paulette is in awe of Kyle, but her low self-confidence prevents her from making a move. When he leaves, Pilar, Serena, and Margot are summoned by Paulette's amazing "Bend and Snap" when picking up the package. The sorority girls tell Paulette to use the "Bend and Snap" dance move on Kyle to turn him on, but when she does, she accidentally breaks his nose ("Bend and Snap").

At the trial, Brooke's pool boy Nikos claims to have been having an affair with Brooke, giving her a motive for murdering her husband. After doing the Bend and Snap in front of Nikos and getting no response, Elle suspects that Nikos is gay, although Callahan and her teammates are not convinced. Her colleagues posit that his perceived flamboyance might just be a cultural difference as Nikos is European. Emmett successfully makes Nikos slip and state that his boyfriend's name is Carlos, although Nikos claims that he misunderstood "boyfriend" for "best friend". Carlos, fed up with the closeted nature of his gay boyfriend, appears from the gallery and proclaims Nikos's homosexuality. Nikos confesses that he is indeed gay and European ("There! Right There! (Gay or European?)").

Later that night in Callahan's office, the interns celebrate Elle's skill. Warner finds problems with calling a finely tuned awareness of homosexuality a legal victory. Callahan, annoyed with Warner's behavior, sends Warner out of the room to fetch a coffee. Callahan dismisses Emmett and the other interns but requests Elle to remain for a few moments. Callahan forcibly kisses Elle, who slaps him. In turn, Callahan fires her. Warner and Vivienne both see the kiss through the door of the room. Warner turns away in anger, leaving Vivienne to be the only one to witness the slap. After Callahan leaves, Warner re-enters the office and mocks Elle, but Vivienne tells him to shut up and they both leave. A defeated Elle prepares to go home, despite Emmett asking her to stay, finally realizing that he is in love with her ("Legally Blonde").

Elle heads to the Hair Affair to say goodbye to Paulette, but before she can leave, Vivienne and Enid convince Elle otherwise. Elle discards her lawyerly navy suit, dons a pink dress and leads a parade back to the courtroom. They meet Kyle on the way, who has taken a liking to Paulette, and reveals himself to be Irish, prompting everyone present to Irish dance. Back at the trial, Brooke fires Callahan and hires Elle ("Legally Blonde Remix"). Brooke's stepdaughter Chutney goes to the witness stand and her testimony is damning, stating after she got out of the shower she saw Brooke covered in her father's blood. After Chutney states she received a perm the day of the murder, Elle realizes a flaw in Chutney's alibi and suggests that the entire court should be moved to the scene of the crime—the bathroom where the murder took place ("Scene of the Crime"). As a demonstration, Elle asks Paulette to give Enid a perm and asks Enid to step into the shower upon entering the crime scene. Relying on her knowledge of hair maintenance, Elle's demonstration is successful as Enid walks out of the shower with completely flattened hair—revealing that Chutney could not have possibly showered immediately after getting a perm because her perm was still intact. Under Elle's intense questioning, Chutney confesses that she killed her father, thinking that it was Brooke ("Omigod You Guys (Reprise)"). Chutney is arrested and Brooke is set free.

Warner proposes to Elle, having been dumped by Vivienne. Elle gently refuses, claiming to have been changed by the experience. Three years later, Elle ends up as the valedictorian of her class. Paulette tells the audience that Elle is not one to brag about her valedictorian status, so she decided to allow Paulette to play "Where Are They Now" during her speech. Paulette says that Enid practices family law, Vivienne is training for the Peace Corps, and Warner dropped out to pursue a modeling career. Callahan ran for governor but was defeated, and his wife hired Emmett to handle their divorce. Paulette married Kyle, had two kids and is pregnant with a third. They live in Worcester, Massachusetts, and Paulette bought a new salon ("Find My Way"). At the end of the graduation, Elle proposes to Emmett, who happily accepts ("Finale").

Musical numbers

† - Not featured on Original Broadway Cast Recording

Act I 
 "Omigod You Guys" – Elle, Serena, Margot, Pilar, Salesgirls, and Delta Nu's
 "Serious" – Warner and Elle
 "Daughter of Delta Nu" – Serena, Margot, Pilar and Delta Nu's †
 "What You Want" – Elle, Serena, Margot, Pilar, Kate, Elle's Parents, Grandmaster Chad and Company
 "The Harvard Variations" – Emmett, Aaron, Enid, Padamadan, Warner and  Harvard Students
 "Blood in the Water" – Callahan, Chad, Enid, Elle, Vivienne and Harvard Students
 "Positive" – Elle, Serena, Margot, Pilar and Greek Chorus
 "Ireland" – Paulette
 "Ireland" (Reprise) – Paulette
 "Serious" (Reprise) – Elle and Warner
 "Chip On My Shoulder" – Elle, Emmett, Greek Chorus
 "Run Rufus Run/Elle Reflects"- Elle, Emmett †
 "So Much Better" – Elle, Greek Chorus and Company

Act II 
 "Whipped into Shape" – Brooke, Callahan and Company
 "Delta Nu Nu Nu" – Elle and Brooke †
 "Take It Like a Man" – Elle, Emmett and Salespeople
 "Kyle the Magnificent" – Kyle †
 "Bend and Snap" – Elle, Paulette, Serena, Margot, Pilar, hairdressers, Kyle, and Company
 "There! Right There!" – Elle, Callahan, Emmett, Brooke, Vivienne, Warner, Enid, Judge, Nikos, Carlos and Company
 "Legally Blonde" – Elle and Emmett
 "Legally Blonde Remix" – Vivienne, Elle, Paulette, Kyle, Enid, Elle's Parents, Margot, Serena, Pilar, Brooke and Company
 "Scene of the Crime" – Elle, Judge, Serena, Margot, Pilar and Company †
 "Omigod You Guys (Reprise)" – Elle, Brooke, Margot, Serena, Pilar, Judge, and Company †
 "Find My Way/Finale" – Elle, Paulette, Emmett and Company

During its San Francisco run, the musical included a song called "Love and War", but during its transfer to Broadway, the song was replaced with what is now "Positive". Another predecessor to "Positive" was "Beacon of Positivity".

During the musical's workshop stage, the song "Good Boy" existed in what would go on to become "Ireland"'s place in the musical. In the song, Paulette and Elle bond over the idea that men are like dogs and should therefore be treated as such.

"Bows" is featured as an iTunes bonus track on the UK iTunes on the Live London Cast Recording but not featured on the Broadway recording. "Kyle the Magnificent" is also a bonus track on the Live London Cast Recording after "Take It Like a Man", which is where it is in the show. On the Broadway Cast Recording, it is a hidden track at the end of "Find My Way/Finale".

Instrumentation
The licensed orchestration follows the orchestration that was used in the West End production: three keyboards, bass, guitar, drums, percussion, two woodwind parts, two trumpets, trombone, and solo violin. The first keyboard part is played by the conductor. The bass part doubles on electric bass, double bass, fretless bass, and 5-string bass. The guitar doubles on electric, acoustic, nylon-string, Hollow Body archtop and 12-string guitars, as well as mandolin. The first woodwind part doubles on alto sax, flute, piccolo, clarinet, oboe (optional), and English horn (optional); the second part doubles on flute, clarinet, and baritone sax. Both trumpets double on flugelhorn and the trombone doubles on tenor and bass trombones.

This orchestration was originally used for the first United States national tour, without the violin and with slightly different reed doublings. The first reed player doubled on alto sax, clarinet, flute, piccolo, oboe (optional), and English horn (optional); the second player doubled on flute, clarinet, bass clarinet, tenor and baritone sax, and pennywhistle.

In addition to the licensed orchestration, the original Broadway production also had a French horn part, a viola and cello part, a second guitar, and had three woodwind parts instead of two. The first reed part doubled on alto sax, clarinet, flute, piccolo, and pennywhistle; the second part doubled on clarinet, flute, oboe, English horn, and tenor sax; the third doubled on flute, clarinet, bass clarinet, bassoon, and baritone sax.

Production history

Broadway (2007–2008)
Before going to Broadway, Legally Blonde did a short tryout at San Francisco's Golden Gate Theatre from January 23 to February 25, 2007, with an official opening on February 5. Legally Blonde later opened on Broadway at the Palace Theatre on April 29, 2007, following previews which began on April 3. The production was directed and choreographed by Jerry Mitchell, with set design by David Rockwell, costume design by Gregg Barnes, sound design by Acme Sound Partners, and lighting design by Kenneth Posner and Paul Miller. The original Broadway cast included Laura Bell Bundy in the lead role of Elle Woods and featured Christian Borle, Orfeh, and Michael Rupert. The show received mixed reviews and was nominated for seven Tony Awards, including Best Original Score and Best Leading Actress in a Musical, but did not win any.

The musical was filmed for television in front of a live audience on September 18, 2007, as well as two other dates where it was filmed without an audience. The three performances edited together were broadcast on MTV on October 13 and 14, 2007, with subsequent air dates on November 3 and 14, 2007. MTV's involvement with the musical continued with a reality show program called Legally Blonde: The Musical – The Search for Elle Woods, which aimed to cast the next actress to play Elle Woods on Broadway, replacing Laura Bell Bundy. The show was hosted by Haylie Duff and premiered on June 2, 2008, on MTV. The show ran for eight episodes. The focus was on the preparation and coaching of the contestants, as well as the auditions themselves. The competition was won by Bailey Hanks, age 20, from Anderson, South Carolina. The results were first aired on July 21, 2008, on MTV, and Hanks's debut as Elle Woods was on July 23. The runner-up, Autumn Hurlbert, also debuted on Broadway in this show as a sorority sister in Delta Nu, as well as serving as Hanks's understudy.

The production closed on October 19, 2008, after playing 30 previews and 595 regular performances. The run was considered a financial disappointment and failed to fully recoup its investment.

North American tours
The first national tour started on September 21, 2008. Becky Gulsvig, who appeared in the ensemble of the original Broadway cast and understudied the role of Elle Woods, was featured as Elle Woods. Lauren Ashley Zakrin and Rhiannon Hansen, both finalists of the MTV reality show, appeared in the national tour. The original tour closed on August 15, 2010, in Vienna, Virginia, at the Wolf Trap National Park for the Performing Arts.

A non-Equity tour launched in Jackson, Mississippi, on September 21, 2010. Nikki Bohne led the cast as Elle Woods, with Kahlil Joseph as Professor Callahan. The tour closed on May 15, 2011, at the Shubert Theatre in New Haven, Connecticut.

It was announced through BroadwayWorld that the show will embark on a 2022 non-Equity US Tour was announced in early August and will begin performances in Fayetteville, Arkansas on October 14, 2022.

West End (2009–2012)
The West End production opened at the Savoy Theatre on January 13, 2010, following previews from December 5, 2009. The original London cast included Sheridan Smith in the lead role of Elle Woods, with Duncan James, Alex Gaumond, Jill Halfpenny and Peter Davison. In the London production, the lyrics to “Ireland” were changed.<ref name="ireland">{{cite news|last=Hetrick|first=Adam|date=2010-05-24|title=Legally Blonde'''s 'Ireland' Gets New Lyrics|work=Playbill|url=https://www.playbill.com/article/legally-blondes-ireland-gets-new-lyrics-com-191204|url-status=live|access-date=March 24, 2021}}</ref>

In October 2009, Sheridan Smith, with other cast members, recorded a pop video to the song "So Much Better". The West End cast of Legally Blonde performed a medley from the show at the BBC Television Centre on November 19, 2009, during the Children in Need telethon.Legally Blonde was the first West End show to offer a ticket lottery. The trend is popular on Broadway but had never been used for a West End production. The show had taken £2 million in advance sales before it officially opened. It extended its booking period from the earlier date of October 2011 until March 31, 2012.

Susan McFadden replaced Sheridan Smith as Elle on January 10, 2011. McFadden was later replaced by Carley Stenson on July 11, 2011. Other notable replacements included Richard Fleeshman and Ben Freeman as Warner, Denise van Outen and Natalie Casey as Paulette, Lee Mead and Stephen Ashfield as Emmett, Carley Stenson as Margot, and Siobhan Dillon as Vivienne.

The West End show won three Laurence Olivier Awards on March 13, 2011: Best New Musical, Best Actress in a Musical (Sheridan Smith), and Best Performance in a Supporting Role in a Musical (Jill Halfpenny).

The show closed in London on April 7, 2012, after 974 performances, significantly more than it played on Broadway.

First national UK tour
The first UK tour began on July 8, 2011, at the Liverpool Empire Theatre. The cast included Faye Brooks as Elle, Dave Willetts as Professor Callahan, and Iwan Lewis as Emmett. Liz McClarnon initially played Paulette, followed by Claire Sweeney.

Following Willets, Professor Callahan was played by Matthew Kelly, and later Les Dennis, alongside Niki Evans as Paulette. Amy Lennox covered as Elle for the Aberdeen run of the tour, with Stephen Ashfield briefly reprising his role as Emmett just weeks after leaving the show in London. On July 17, 2012, Jennifer Ellison replaced Niki Evans as Paulette, and Gareth Gates replaced Ray Quinn as Warner.

The final show of the UK tour was performed at the New Wimbledon Theatre on October 6, 2012.

Australian production 2012
The Australian production began previews in September 2012 at the Lyric Theatre, Sydney, before opening on October 4, 2012.

Lucy Durack played Elle Woods with Rob Mills as Warner, David Harris as Emmett, Erika Heynatz as Brooke Wyndham, and Helen Dallimore as Paulette, with Cameron Daddo returning to the Australian stage for the first time in 20 years to play Professor Callahan.

The production concluded its run at Melbourne's Princess Theatre on July 14, 2013. The show won five Helpmann Awards, including Best Musical.

International productionsLegally Blonde has had international productions in South Korea, China, Malaysia, Japan, the Netherlands, the Philippines, Sweden, Finland, Austria, Dominican Republic, Panama, New Zealand, and Germany.

In Paris, France, a French-language production opened on May 17, 2012, at Le Palace. The show was a commercial flop and closed on June 10, 2012, after only three weeks because of the lack of spectators.

A Hebrew-language production of Legally Blonde was planned to premiere in Israel in February 2020. The cast included Ania Bukstein as Elle Woods, Oz Zehavi as Emmett, Sassi Keshet as Professor Callahan, Hana Laszlo as Paulette, and Mei Finegold as Brooke.

Leicester production (2016)
In April and May 2016, a production was presented at the Curve Theatre, Leicester. The cast included X-Factor finalist Lucie Jones cast as Elle Woods, Ian Kelsey as Callahan, Tupele Dorgu as Paulette, Jon Robyns as Emmett, and Danny Mac as Warner.

 Second national UK tour 
Throughout 2017 and 2018, the second national UK tour of Legally Blonde performed with a new cast. The first performance was at the Churchill Theatre from September 14 to 23, 2017, and its final performance was at the Palace Theatre on June 30, 2018. The cast included Lucie Jones as Elle Woods, David Barret as Emmet, Liam Doyle as Warner, Rita Simons as Paulette, Helen Petrovna as Brooke, and Laura Harrison as Vivienne.

 London revival (2022) 
A London revival opened at the Regent's Park Open Air Theatre from 13 May to 2 July 2022. It was directed by Lucy Moss and choreographed by Ellen Kane. It starred Courtney Bowman as Elle, Michael Ahomka-Lindsay as Emmett, Lauren Drew as Brooke, Vanessa Fisher as Vivienne, Iz Hesketh as Margot, Nadine Higgin as Paulette, Alžbeta Matyšáková as Enid, Eugene McCoy as Callahan, Grace Mouat as Pilar, Alistair Toovey as Warner, and Hannah Yun Chamberlain as Serena. Hesketh was the first Trans Non-Binary Person to play Margot and Matyšáková was the first Trans Non-Binary person to play Enid in a professional production of the show, with the character of Enid having been changed to match Matyšáková Non-Binary identity.

Principal roles

Casts
The principal original casts of the major productions of Legally Blonde.

 The cast for the TV airing, filmed in mid-September 2007, consisted of the entire original Broadway cast, except for Tracy Jai Edwards taking over for Leslie Kritzer as Serena and Asmeret Ghebremichael replacing DeQuina Moore as Pilar. Moore departed from the production in July 2007, and Kritzer left in August that same year.

 Notable Broadway replacements 
Elle Woods: Bailey Hanks
Emmett: Andy Karl (u/s)
Callahan: Andy Karl (u/s)
Margot: Kate Rockwell
Pilar: Asmeret Ghebremichael

Critical response
The musical received mixed reviews but was praised for being a fun and upbeat production. Ben Brantley, reviewing the musical in The New York Times, wrote that the show was a "high-energy, empty-calories, and expensive-looking hymn to the glories of girlishness". He praised Laura Bell Bundy, saying, "she sings and dances flawlessly, and she delivers silly lines as if she meant them." Clive Barnes, in his New York Post review, praised Heather Hach's book but criticized the "amorphous, synthetic, and maniacally empty-headed music", summarizing the show as "a pleasant if noisy night out". Elysa Gardner for USA Today wrote that the musical was an "ingratiating trifle", and the "game cast ensure that the proceedings, however patronizing, aren't irritating." Jeremy McCarter in New York Magazine lamented that the musical "doesn’t summon memories of Tracy Flick, the steely student-council campaigner that Reese Witherspoon played in Election before starring in Legally Blonde", writing that the "Flickish manic drive" in Witherspoon's Legally Blonde performance had been his favorite part of the film.

The West End production received mostly positive reviews. Benedict Nightingale in The Times wrote, "Let's overlook some forgettable tunes and welcome dance that embraces everything from skipping with ropes to spoof Riverdance. Let's relish the support both of a fake-Greek chorus dressed as cheerleaders and of two cute, unnaturally obedient dogs. Let's agree that Legally Blonde is, well, fun". Paul Taylor for The Independent called the show "Ridiculously enjoyable from start to finish."

The show also received some negative criticism. Tim Walker wrote in The Sunday Telegraph: "It is a great big empty vessel of a show that makes a lot of noise and not much else, and would have been better entitled 'Irredeemably Bland'. I was aware that for the whole of the two hours and 25 minutes that it ran, I was sitting among a group of people with vacant smiles on faces that otherwise seemed entirely numbed. That was how I looked, too. It is the expression that registers when what one is seeing doesn't entirely sync with what is going on in one's brain."

Recordings
The Original Broadway Cast recording was recorded on May 7 and 8, 2007, and released on July 17, 2007, by Ghostlight Records (an imprint of Sh-K-Boom Records). During the week of July 23, 2007, the cast album made its debut on Billboard's Cast Album chart, placing at #1, and it charted at #86 on the Billboard 200.

Before previews, a promotional sampler CD was released including "Omigod You Guys", "So Much Better", and "Take It Like a Man", featuring a slightly divergent cast, arrangement and lyrics of that of the final show's.

During the development phase of the musical, a demo recording was released with twelve songs featuring Kerry Butler and others as Elle. The demo featured workshop versions of "There! Right There!" (labelled on the sampler as "Gay or European"), "Blood in the Water", "Omigod You Guys", "Serious", "What You Want", "Legally Blonde", "Legally Blonde Remix", "So Much Better", and "Take It Like a Man", in addition to two songs not present in the finalized version of the show: "Beacon of Positivity" (which became "Love and War" for the previews and eventually "Positive" for the finalized version of the show) and "Good Boy", a song in the place of "Ireland".

Bailey Hanks, who won the reality show The Search for Elle Woods'', recorded the song "So Much Better", which was released as a single on July 22, 2008.

A live London cast recording was recorded featuring Sheridan Smith, Alex Gaumond, and Duncan James in June 2010. It was released on August 16, 2010. The London Cast Recording used the same track listing as the Broadway Cast Recording, with bonus tracks "Kyle the Magnificent" and the curtain call music added to the digital download version.

Awards and nominations

Original Broadway production

North American Tour

Original West End production

Notes

References

External links

 Official website
 Official Australia Website
 Official UK Website
 
 Legally Blonde: The Musical at the Music Theatre International website

2007 musicals
Broadway musicals
Musicals based on films
Musicals based on novels
Laurence Olivier Award-winning musicals
West End musicals
Blond hair
Legally Blonde (franchise)